Michael Keppele (September 9, 1771 – February 2, 1821) was a lawyer, alderman, and mayor of Philadelphia, 1811–1812.

Graduated from the University of the State of Pennsylvania (now the University of Pennsylvania) in 1788. He was admitted to the Philadelphia bar on September 18, 1792. In 1806, he became an alderman, replacing Michael Hillegas. He was elected mayor on October 15, 1811, and served a one-year term.

He died in Philadelphia.

Family
He married Catherine Caldwell (June 7, 1774 – August 23, 1862).

Their daughter Sarah Caldwell Keppele (1789–1877) married James Cornell Biddle (1795–1838), of the Philadelphia Biddle family in 1825. He was son of revolutionary war soldier Clement Biddle (1740–1814).

References

 

1771 births
1821 deaths
Mayors of Philadelphia